Nxasana is a South African surname. Notable people with the surname include:

Mxolisi Nxasana, Director of Public Prosecutions in South Africa 
Sizwe Nxasana (born 1957), South African businessman  

Surnames of African origin